The Simpsons Trading Card Game is an out-of-print collectible card game by Wizards of the Coast based on The Simpsons TV series by Matt Groening. The game is not to be confused with the European version The Simpsons Sammelkartenspiel which looked similar but had entirely different gameplay mechanics and was released in 2001. The Simpsons TCG was first released in fall of 2003. The core set titled Krusty Approved had 156 cards. Four pre-made Theme decks were released.

Gameplay
Players use 40 card decks, in a 2-5 player game. The goal is to get 7 points and the first player to do so, wins.

Each player may play a Scene card (if that player doesn't have one in play), play Character cards at a Scene, declare an eligible scene completed or trashed, or play an Action card. At the end of a player's turn, they may discard as many cards as they like and draw up to 6 cards. Only Action cards can be played on another player's turn.

When a scene is completed, the player completing the scene, and any other player with characters used to complete the scene, score 1 point. A bonus point is awarded to the player with the most characters involved in completing a scene, unless there is a tie, then no bonus is awarded, or if the scene was trashed.

Reception
The game was considered rules "light" and it didn't take itself too seriously as it lacked the competitive feel of games like Magic: the Gathering or Yu-Gi-Oh! Trading Card Game. The game had a hard time bridging the gap between being too expensive for casual players and being too casual for competitive players. It was also recommended that at least 3 people play a game together.

References

Card games introduced in 2003
Collectible card games
Wizards of the Coast games